Anita Raj Khurana (born 1962 or 1963) is an Indian actress and daughter of Jagdish Raj, whose notable roles include Films Prem Geet (1981), Ghulami  (1985), Kusum in Zara Si Zindagi (1983), Anita in Zameen Aasman (1984) and Shobha in Masterji (1985). She is known for playing Rajmata Devvadan Singh Deo in Ek Tha Raja Ek Thi Rani and Kulwant Kaur Dhillon in Choti Sarrdaarni.  She did maximum movies with Dharmendra.

Filmography

Film

Prem Geet (1981) as Shikha
Mehndi Rang Layegi (1982)
Dulha Bikta Hai (1982) as Shayla
Zara Si Zindagi (1983) as Kusum
Thai Veedu (1983, Tamil Movie)
Prem Tapasya (1983) as Anita
Kaun? Kaisey? (1983) as Preeti
Jeet Hamaari (1983) as Anita (as Anitaraj)
Naukar Biwi Ka (1983) as Jyoti Nath 'Rani'
Achha Bura (1983) as Rita Roy
Bad Aur Badnaam (1984) as Dr. Anita Mathur
Zameen Aasmaan (1984) as Anita
Lakhon Ki Baat (1984) as Shobha Prakash
Laila (1984) as Padmini Singh (as Anita Raaj)
Andar Baahar (1984) as Girl that Raja met outside the prison
Jeene Nahi Doonga (1984) as Bijli - Raka's girlfriend
Ab Ayega Mazaa (1984) as Nupur
Karm Yudh (1985) as Usha Saxena
Masterji (1985) as Shobha
Ghulami (1985) as Tulsi
Jaan Ki Baazi (1985)
Lover Boy (1985) as Bijli
Zulm Ka Badla (1985) as Geeta A. Verma / Mrs. D'Sa (as Anita Raaj)
Yaar Kasam (1985) (as Anita Raaj)
Karishma Kudrat Kaa (1985) as Paro
Bihari Babu (1985)
Ilzaam (1986) as Kamal
Kala Dhanda Goray Log (1986) as Sandhya (as Anita Raaj)
Pyar Kiya Hai Pyar Karenge (1986) as Shobha
Teesra Kinara (1986)
Mazloom (1986) as Purnima 'Poonam' A. Singh / Purnima V. Singh (as Anita Raaj)
Asli Naqli (1986) as Anita
Ek Aur Sikander (1986) as Shama Khan
Mohabbat Ki Kasam (1986) as Shop-owner's wife
Mera Haque (1986) as Bijli
Jwala (1986) as Mastani
Keeping Fit with Anita Raj (1987)
Insaniyat Ke Dushman (1987) as Shashi
Hawalaat (1987) as Salma / Shamim Khan
Satyamev Jayate (1987) as Vidya Kaul (Anita Raaj)
Hiraasat (1987) as Renu (as Anita Raaj)
Insaf Ki Pukar (1987) as Police Inspector Sheela (as Anita Raaj)
Anjaam khuda jaane (1988)
Sagar Sangam (a.k.a. The Meeting of Rivers) (India: English title) (1988) as Subitra
Shiv Shakti (1988) as Dolly
Mera Muqaddar (1988) as Dancer (uncredited)
Ghar Ghar Ki Kahani (1988) as Deepa
Mahaveera (1988) as Dancer
Paap Ko Jalaa Kar Raakh Kar Doonga (1988) as Vandana (as Anita Raaj)
Paanch Fauladi (1988) as Annu
Zalzala (1988) as Sheela
Saazish (1988) as Roma
Asmaan Se Ooncha (1989) as Anita Malik
Nafrat Ki Aandhi (1989) as Radha
Clerk (1989) as Pooja
Do Yaar (1989)
Billoo Badshah (1989) as Asha
Abhimanyu (1989) as Lalita
Taaqatwar (1989) as Anju Khurana (as Anita Raaj)
Jurrat (1989) as Julie
Pati Patni Aur Tawaif (1990) as Kiran
Hum Se Na Takrana (1990) as Sundari
Zimmedaaar (1990) as Anita (as Anita Raaj)
Sher Dil (1990) as Kiran Kailashnath
Khatarnaak (1990) as Helena
Atishbaz (1990) as Reshma
Kasam Kali Ki (1991)
Kaun Kare Kurbanie (1991) as Anita A. Singh
Swarg Jaisaa Ghar (1991) as Savitri
Maut Ki Sazaa (1991) as Jyotsna (as Anita Raaj)
Jasa Baap Tashi Poore (1991) as Dr. Anita (Marathi Movie)
Adharm (1992) as Sharda
Virodhi (1992) as Mrs. Shekhar
Mehndi Shagna Di (1992) as Rano 
Saboot Mangta Hain Kanoon (1994) as Anita
Ghar Ki Izzat (a.k.a. The Honor of the House) (International: English title) (1994) as Sheela S. Kumar
Faisla Main Karungi (1995) as Jenny A. Singh
Gehra Raaz (1996)
Thodi Life Thoda Magic (2007)
Chaar Din Ki Chandni (2012) as Devika Singh
Bagaavat (2019)
Yaaram (2019) as Vijeta Bajaj
Mudda 370 J&K (2019) as Aasma's mother
Deendayal Ek Yugpurush (2019) as Lata Khanna

Television

References

External links

 
 

Living people
Indian film actresses
Indian television actresses
Actresses in Hindi cinema
Actresses from Mumbai
20th-century Indian actresses
21st-century Indian actresses
Actresses in Hindi television
1962 births